Zeta Phi Eta is a national professional fraternity in Communication Arts and Sciences founded on October 10, 1893. It is recognized as the oldest professional fraternity for women, though membership is now co-ed.

History
Zeta Phi Eta was founded in 1893 as the first professional Communications fraternity at Northwestern University in Evanston Illinois. The organization began in when Edith deVore conceived the idea of a club exclusively for students of the School of Oratory (later the School of Communication). DeVore was joined by Molly Connor, Laurine Wright, Maude Newell, and Leila Little, and the group called itself the "F.O.E.  club", vowing to be a Friend of Each, Each Our Friend. The women held secret meetings before receiving formal approval for the Zeta Phi Eta sorority in 1894 from Dr. Cumnock, Dean of the School of Oratory.

The Fraternity was incorporated on  under the laws of the State of Illinois. Reflecting the organization’s status as a professional, rather than an honorary or social, society, the charter proclaims, “This society is to promote a greater excellence in oratorical and dramatic art, and to develop a social interest and a stronger friendship toward each other.”

In 1908, the fraternity began to expand when a Zeta at Northwestern corresponded with a friend at Emerson College of Oratory in Boston, Massachusetts, who belonged to an organization with similar values and goals, Phi Eta Sigma. When the two chapters affiliated under the name of Zeta Phi Eta, Alpha chapter status was bestowed upon the Emerson organization. The cameo and pearl pin of Alpha became the official badge, and the shield and torch of Beta, the coat of arms.

During the 1910s and 1920s, campus and alumnae chapters grew quickly at institutions around the country. The fraternity first published CAMEO in 1913, a national magazine which continues to be published quarterly.

In 1941, total membership of the fraternity was reported to be approximately 3,000 women across nineteen collegiate chapters and fifteen alumnae chapters. Since 1950 the fraternity broadened its focus in the speech arts, to include communications arts and sciences.

In 1955, the Zeta Phi Eta Foundation was established to contribute to "worthy speech and drama projects". One long-term project initiated by the Zeta alumnae in 1960 was a full-scale nationwide tape recording program for the Library of Congress, recording tapes of published works for access by blind patrons. Another national project, Graduate Assistantship Opportunities, was designed to provide professional guidance to senior members of campus chapters upon entering graduate school.

Affiliations over the years have included:  
The American Theatre Association
The Professional Panhellenic Association now the PFA
The Speech Communications Association
The Children's Theatre Association

Purpose 
The Fraternity identifies four mission statements which guide its operations:

 To band together individuals committed to high standards in communication arts and sciences;
 To provide opportunities for sharing professional interests through participation in worthwhile activities in the fields of communication;
 To provide a climate in which members may develop sound professional philosophies; and
 To stimulate and encourage all worthy enterprises in the communication fields.

Membership 
While originally established as a women-exclusive sorority, Zeta Phi Eta began extending its membership to male students in 1975.

Since its founding, Zeta Phi Eta membership has expanded to welcome undergraduate and graduate students focusing on a wide range of communications-related fields. These include:

 Journalism
 Public relations
 Graphic design
 Photography
 Speech pathology
 Drama
 Marketing
 English literature and creative writing
 Language studies
 Political science

Symbol and traditions
The Fraternity's colors are Rose and White.

The Fraternity flower is the "La France Rose."

The Fraternity badge is a rose-colored cameo upon which is carved the letter name of the Fraternity in white, surrounded by 23 pearls.

The Fraternity magazine is the Cameo, along with occasionally a Prospectus and Pledge Manual.

Notable Members and Alumnae 

 Winifred Ward - founder of the Children’s Theatre of Evanston (Beta Chapter)
 Marcelline Hemingway Sanford - sister of author Ernest Hemingway (Beta Chapter)
 Louise Starkey, Isobel Carothers, and Helen King - creators and stars of the 1930’s WGN radio program, “Clara, Lu and Em” (Beta Chapter)
 Madge Evans - American stage and film actress (honorary member)
 Jessica Tandy - British-American actress (honorary member)
 Ethel Waters -  American singer and actress (honorary member)
 Charlton Heston - American actor and political activist (honorary member)

Active Chapters 
There are currently six active campus chapters of Zeta Phi Eta. Listed by date of founding, campus chapters are located at the following schools. Active chapters noted in bold, inactive chapters in italics:

Notes

See also

 Professional fraternities and sororities

References

Student organizations established in 1893
Professional fraternities and sororities in the United States
Former members of Professional Fraternity Association
1893 establishments in Illinois